The Men's 50 metre butterfly S6 swimming event at the 2004 Summer Paralympics was competed on 25 September. It was won by Li Peng, representing .

1st round

Heat 1
25 Sept. 2004, morning session

Heat 2
25 Sept. 2004, morning session

Final round

25 Sept. 2004, evening session

References

M